Bolshekolpanskoe Rural Settlement is a rural settlement in Gatchina Municipal District of the Leningrad Oblast (Leningrad Province) in northern Russia. The Bolshekolpanskoe Rural Settlement contains 16 villages. The administrative center is the village of Bolshiye Kolpany (Great Kolpany).

Geography
The Bolshekolpanskoe Rural Settlement is near the center of the Gatchina District, bordered on the north by the Pudostskim Rural Settlement, on the north-east by the Novyi Svet Rural Settlement and the City of Gatchina, on the east by the Kobrin Rural Settlement, on the south by the Roždestvenskoe Rural Settlement, on the south-west by Volosovsky Municipal District, on the west by the Elizavetinskoe Rural Settlement, and on the north-west by the Voyskovitskim Rural Settlement.

The following highways run through the Settlement:
 (R23 highway) which runs from St. Petersburg through Pskov to the Belarusian border. This highway is part of European Route .
, the St. Petersburg Southern Ring Road, running Serovo – Kirovsk – Bolshaya Izhora
P-38, running Gatchina – Opole

Geology
The Bolshekolpanskoe Rural Settlement is located on the Izhora Plateau, thus there are very few ponds or lakes in its area. The largest ponds are artificial ones which have resulted from the infilling of stone quarries in Paritsa and Bornitskaya. The Rural Settlement includes the headwaters of Sivoritsky Creek, which joins the Suyda River at the village of Paritsa.

The presence on the plateau of limestone and dolomite, creating a karst landscape, has led to the formation of large karst caves. These caves, which are sealed off from the atmosphere, were used beginning in Soviet times for the storage of natural gas reserves.

History
The area of the Bolshekolpanskoe Rural Settlement was part of the heartland of Ingria, home of the pre-Russian Izhorians and Votes, peoples who are now on the brink of extinction.

In 1973, under the Soviet Union, the Bolshekolpanskoe Village Council was formed as part of the Gatchina District (Gatchina Raion).

On January 18, 1994, by Order Number 10 ("On Changes in the Administrative-Territorial Districts of the Leningrad Region") of the Leningrad Region (Leningrad Oblast), the Bolshekolpanskoe Village Council was redesignated as Bolshekolpanskoe Parish (the other village councils in the District were likewise redesignated by this order).

On January 1, 2006, in accordance with Regional Law Number 133–OZ of December 16, 2004, Bolshekolpanskoe Parish was redesignated as Bolshekolpanskoe Rural Settlement.

Population

Economy
The Bolshekolpanskoe Rural Settlement contains 85 industrial or service enterprises (as of 2015), the largest being the Gatchina Company, which owns more than a third of the Settlement and which is mainly engaged in agricultural production – dairy farming, potatoes, vegetables. The Gatchina Feed Mill, in the village of Malye Kolpany (Lesser Kolpany), is one of Russia's largest producers of animal feed.

The caverns in the karst continue to be used to store natural gas. There are also active dolomite quarries. The Settlement also contains various small businesses, engaged in pursuits such as trade, personal services, repair and maintenance of motor vehicles, and so forth. The Sivoritsy Airfield is located in the village of Nikolskoye.

Constituent communities

References

Notes

Rural localities in Leningrad Oblast